Hoyland Common Athletic F.C. was an English association football club based in Hoyland, South Yorkshire.

History
Little is known of the club other than that it competed in the FA Cup in the 1940s.

League and cup history

Records
Best FA Cup performance: 3rd Qualifying Round, 1949–50

References

Defunct football clubs in England
Defunct football clubs in South Yorkshire
Barnsley Association League